Propaganda of the deed (or propaganda by the deed, from the French ) is specific political direct action meant to be exemplary to others and serve as a catalyst for revolution.

It is primarily associated with acts of violence perpetrated by proponents of insurrectionary anarchism in the late 19th and early 20th century, including bombings and assassinations aimed at the ruling class, but also had non-violent applications. These deeds were intended to ignite the "spirit of revolt" in the people by demonstrating the state was not omnipotent and by offering hope to the downtrodden, and also to expand support for anarchist movements as the state grew more repressive in its response. In 1881, the International Anarchist Congress of London gave the tactic its approval.

Anarchist origins

Various definitions 
One of the first individuals to conceptualise propaganda by the deed was the Italian revolutionary Carlo Pisacane (1818–1857), who wrote in his "Political Testament" (1857) that "ideas spring from deeds and not the other way around." Mikhail Bakunin (1814–1876), in his "Letters to a Frenchman on the Present Crisis" (1870) stated that "we must spread our principles, not with words but with deeds, for this is the most popular, the most potent, and the most irresistible form of propaganda." The concept, in a broader setting, has a rich heritage, as the words of Francis of Assisi reveal: "Let them show their love by the works they do for each other, according as the Apostle says: 'let us not love in word or in tongue, but in deed and in truth.

Some anarchists, such as Johann Most, advocated publicizing violent acts of retaliation against counter-revolutionaries because "we preach not only action in and for itself, but also action as propaganda." It was not advocacy for mass murder, but a call for targeted killings of the representatives of capitalism and government at a time when such action might garner sympathy from the population, such as during periods of government repression or labor conflicts, although Most himself once claimed that "the existing system will be quickest and most radically overthrown by the annihilation of its exponents. Therefore, massacres of the enemies of the people must be set in motion." In 1885, he published The Science of Revolutionary Warfare, a technical manual for acquiring and detonating explosives based on the knowledge he acquired by working at an explosives factory in New Jersey. Most was an early influence on American anarchists Emma Goldman and Alexander Berkman. Berkman attempted propaganda by the deed when he tried in 1892 to kill industrialist Henry Clay Frick following the deaths by shooting of several striking workers.

Beverly Gage, professor of U.S. history at Yale University, elaborates on what the concept meant to outsiders and those within the anarchist movement:

By the 1880s, the slogan "propaganda of the deed" had begun to be used both within and outside of the anarchist movement to refer to individual bombings, regicides and tyrannicides. In 1881, "propaganda by the deed" was formally adopted as a strategy by the anarchist London Congress.  In 1886, French anarchist Clément Duval achieved a form of propaganda of the deed, stealing 15,000 francs from the mansion of a Parisian socialite, before accidentally setting the house on fire. Caught two weeks later, he was dragged from the court crying "Long live anarchy!", and condemned to death. Duval's sentence was later commuted to hard labor on Devil's Island, French Guiana. In the anarchist paper Révolte, Duval famously declared that, "Theft exists only through the exploitation of man by man... when Society refuses you the right to exist, you must take it... the policeman arrested me in the name of the Law, I struck him in the name of Liberty".

As early as 1887, a few important figures in the anarchist movement had begun to distance themselves from individual acts of violence. Peter Kropotkin thus wrote that year in Le Révolté that "a structure based on centuries of history cannot be destroyed with a few kilos of dynamite". A variety of anarchists advocated the abandonment of these sorts of tactics in favor of collective revolutionary action, for example through the trade union movement. The anarcho-syndicalist, Fernand Pelloutier, argued in 1895 for renewed anarchist involvement in the labor movement on the basis that anarchism could do very well without "the individual dynamiter."

State repression (including the infamous 1894 French lois scélérates) of the anarchist and labor movements following the few successful bombings and assassinations may have contributed to the abandonment of these kinds of tactics, although reciprocally state repression, in the first place, may have played a role in these isolated acts. The dismemberment of the French socialist movement, into many groups and, following the suppression of the 1871 Paris Commune, the execution and exile of many communards to penal colonies, favored individualist political expression and acts.

Anarchist historian Max Nettlau provided a more complex concept of propaganda when he said that,

Later anarchist authors advocating "propaganda of the deed" included the German anarchist Gustav Landauer, and the Italians Errico Malatesta and Luigi Galleani. For Gustav Landauer, "propaganda of the deed" meant the creation of libertarian social forms and communities that would inspire others to transform society. In "Weak Statesmen, Weaker People," he wrote that the state is not something "that one can smash in order to destroy. The state is a relationship between human beings... one destroys it by entering into other relationships." Errico Malatesta described "propaganda by the deed" as violent communal insurrections that were meant to ignite the imminent revolution. Though in the last analysis Malatesta considered violence a necessity, he considered it an anarchist's duty to warn of its dangers, writing:

At the other extreme, the anarchist Luigi Galleani, perhaps the most vocal proponent of "propaganda by the deed" from the turn of the century through the end of the First World War, took undisguised pride in describing himself as a subversive, a revolutionary propagandist and advocate of the violent overthrow of established government and institutions through the use of 'direct action', i.e., bombings and assassinations. Galleani heartily embraced physical violence and terrorism, not only against symbols of the government and the capitalist system, such as courthouses and factories, but also through direct assassination of 'enemies of the people': capitalists, industrialists, politicians, judges, and policemen.  He had a particular interest in the use of bombs, going so far as to include a formula for the explosive nitroglycerine in one of his pamphlets advertised through his monthly magazine, Cronaca Sovversiva.  By all accounts, Galleani was an extremely effective speaker and advocate of his policy of violent action, attracting a number of devoted Italian-American anarchist followers who called themselves Galleanists.  Carlo Buda, the brother of Galleanist bombmaker Mario Buda, said of him, "You heard Galleani speak, and you were ready to shoot the first policeman you saw".

Illegalism

Propaganda of the deed is also related to illegalism, an anarchist philosophy that developed primarily in France, Italy, Belgium, and Switzerland during the early 20th century as an outgrowth of anarchist individualism. The illegalists openly embraced criminality as a lifestyle. Influenced by theorist Max Stirner's concept of "egoism", the illegalists broke from anarchists like Clément Duval and Marius Jacob who justified theft with a theory of individual reclamation. Instead, the illegalists argued that their actions required no moral basis – illegal acts were taken not in the name of a higher ideal, but in pursuit of one's own desires. France's Bonnot Gang was the most famous group to embrace illegalism.

Relationship to revolution
Propaganda of the deed thus included stealing (in particular bank robberies – named "expropriations" or "revolutionary expropriations" to finance the organization), rioting and general strikes which aimed at creating the conditions of an insurrection or even a revolution. These acts were justified as the necessary counterpart to state repression.  As early as 1911, Leon Trotsky condemned individual acts of violence by anarchists as useful for little more than providing an excuse for state repression. "The anarchist prophets of the 'propaganda by the deed' can argue all they want about the elevating and stimulating influence of terrorist acts on the masses," he wrote in 1911, "Theoretical considerations and political experience prove otherwise." Vladimir Lenin largely agreed, viewing individual anarchist acts of terrorism as an ineffective substitute for coordinated action by disciplined cadres of the masses. Both Lenin and Trotsky acknowledged the necessity of violent rebellion and assassination to serve as a catalyst for revolution, but they distinguished between the ad hoc bombings and assassinations carried out by proponents of the propaganda of the deed, and organized violence coordinated by a professional revolutionary vanguard utilized for that specific end.

Sociologist Max Weber wrote that the state has a "monopoly on the legitimate use of physical force", and, in Karl Marx's words, the state was only the repressive apparatus of the bourgeois class. Propaganda by the deed, including assassinations (sometimes involving bombs, named in French "machines infernales" – "hellish machines", usually made with bombs, sometimes only several guns assembled together), were thus legitimized by part of the anarchist movement and the First International as a valid means to be used in class struggle. The predictable state responses to these actions were supposed to display to the people the inherently repressive nature of the bourgeois state, delegitimizing it (legitimacy being key). This would in turn bolster the revolutionary spirit of the people, leading to the overthrow of the state. This is the basic formula of the cycle protests-repression-protests, which in specific conditions may lead to an effective state of insurrection.

This cycle has been observed during the 1905 Russian Revolution or in Paris in May 1968. However, it failed to achieve its revolutionary objective on the vast majority of occasions, thus leading to the abandonment by the vast majority of the anarchist movement of such bombings.  However, the state never failed in its repressive response, enforcing various  which usually involved tough clampdowns on the whole of the labor movement. These harsh laws, sometimes accompanied by the proclamation of the state of exception, progressively led to increased criticism among the anarchist movement of assassinations. The role of several  and the use of deliberate strategies of tension by governments, using such false flag terrorist actions as the Spanish La Mano Negra, work to discredit this violent tactic in the eyes of most socialist libertarians. John Filiss and Jim Bell are two of the best known modern advocates, with the latter developing the concept of an assassination marketa market system for anonymously hiring and compensating political assassination.

Notable actions 

 April 4, 1866 – Dmitry Karakozov makes an unsuccessful attempt on the life of Tsar Alexander II of Russia at the gates of the Summer Garden in St. Petersburg. As the Tsar leaves the Summer Garden, Dmitry rushes forward to fire his weapon. However, the attempt is thwarted by Osip Komissarov, a peasant-born hatter's apprentice, who jostles Karakozov's elbow just before he fires his shot.
 May 11, 1878 – Max Hödel attempts to assassinate Kaiser Wilhelm I of Germany. He is apprehended and executed by beheading on August 15.
 August 4, 1878 – Sergey Stepnyak-Kravchinsky stabs to death General Nikolai Mezentsov, head of the Tsar's secret police, in response to the execution of Ivan Kovalsky.
 November 17, 1878 – Giovanni Passannante attempts to assassinate King Umberto I of Italy with a dagger. It is the first attempted murder against the monarch and the first in the history of House of Savoy. Passannante is sentenced to death but his penalty is commuted to prison for life. While in jail, he goes insane and is taken to the asylum.
 February 1879 – Grigori Goldenberg shoots Prince Dmitri Kropotkin, the Governor of Kharkov in the Russian Empire, to death.
 April 20, 1879 – Alexander Soloviev attempts to assassinate Tsar Alexander II of Russia. The monarch spots the weapon in his hands and flees, but Soloviev still fires five shots, all of which miss. He is captured and hanged on May 28.
 February 17, 1880 – Stepan Khalturin successfully blows up part of the Winter Palace in an attempt to assassinate Tsar Alexander II of Russia. Although the Tsar escapes unharmed, eight soldiers are killed and 45 wounded. Referring to the 1862 invention of dynamite, historian Benedict Anderson observes that "Nobel's invention had now arrived politically." Khalturin is hanged on the orders of Alexander's son and successor, Alexander III, in 1882 after the assassination of a police official.
 March 1 (Julian calendar) 1881 – Tsar Alexander II of Russia is killed in a bomb blast by Narodnaya Volya.
 July 23, 1892 – Alexander Berkman tries to kill American industrialist Henry Clay Frick in retaliation for the hiring of Pinkerton detectives to break up the Homestead Strike, resulting in the deaths of seven striking members of the Amalgamated Association of Iron and Steel Workers. Although badly wounded, Frick survives, and Berkman is arrested and eventually sentenced to 22 years in prison.

 November 7, 1893 – The Spanish anarchist Santiago Salvador throws two Orsini bombs into the orchestra pit of the Liceu Theater in Barcelona during the second act of the opera Guillaume Tell, killing some twenty people and injuring scores of others.
 December 9, 1893 – Auguste Vaillant throws a nail bomb in the French National Assembly, killing nobody and injuring one. He is then sentenced to death and executed by the guillotine on February 4, 1894, shouting "Death to bourgeois society and long live anarchy!" (A mort la société bourgeoise et vive l'anarchie!). During his trial, Vaillant declares that he had not intended to kill anybody, but only to injure several deputies in retaliation against the execution of Ravachol, who was executed for four bombings.
 February 12, 1894 – Émile Henry, intending to avenge Auguste Vaillant, sets off a bomb in Café Terminus (a café near the Gare Saint-Lazare train station in Paris), killing one and injuring twenty. During his trial, when asked why he wanted to harm so many innocent people, he declares, "There is no innocent bourgeois." This act is one of the rare exceptions to the rule that propaganda of the deed targets only specific powerful individuals. Henry is convicted and executed by guillotine on May 21.
 February 15, 1894 – A chemical explosive carried by Martial Bourdin prematurely detonates outside the Royal Observatory, Greenwich in Greenwich Park, killing him.
 June 24, 1894 – Italian anarchist Sante Geronimo Caserio, seeking revenge for Auguste Vaillant and Émile Henry, stabs Sadi Carnot, the President of France, to death. Caserio is executed by guillotine on August 15.
 June 7, 1896 – Anarchist bombing of a Feast of Corpus Christi procession in Barcelona. Three people were killed instantly and another nine died from their injuries over the following days. The victims, however, were overwhelmingly poor and working class people attending religious worship, which caused some anarchists to denounce and disown the bombing.
 November 3, 1896 – In the Greek city of Patras, Dimitris Matsalis, an anarchist shoemaker, attacks local banker Dionysios Fragkopoulos and merchant Andreas Kollas with a knife. Fragkopoulos is killed on the spot; Kollas is seriously wounded.
 April 22, 1897 – Pietro Acciarito tries to stab King Umberto of Italy. He is sentenced to life imprisonment.

 August 8, 1897 – Michele Angiolillo shoots dead Spanish Prime Minister Antonio Cánovas del Castillo  at a thermal bath resort, seeking vengeance for the imprisonment and torture of alleged revolutionaries at the Montjuïc fortress. Angiolillo is executed by garotte on August 20.

 September 10, 1898 – Luigi Lucheni stabs to death Empress Elisabeth, the consort of Emperor Franz Joseph I of Austria-Hungary, with a needle file in Geneva, Switzerland. Lucheni is sentenced to life in prison and eventually commits suicide in his cell.
 July 29, 1900 – Gaetano Bresci shoots dead King Umberto, in revenge for the Bava Beccaris massacre in Milan. Due to the abolition of capital punishment in Italy, Bresci is sentenced to penal servitude for life on Santo Stefano Island, where he is found dead less than a year later.
 September 6, 1901 – Leon Czolgosz shoots U.S. President William McKinley at point-blank range at the Pan-American Exposition in Buffalo, New York. McKinley dies on September 14, and Czolgosz is executed by electric chair on October 29. Czolgosz's anarchist views have been debated.
 April 23, 1902 – Luigi Galleani speaks to striking silk workers at a factory in Paterson, New Jersey, urging all American workers to declare a general strike and overthrow Capitalism in the U.S.  Galleani, who is wounded in the face when police open fire on the striking workers, is later indicted for inciting a riot. He flees to Canada, where he is apprehended and returned to the US by Canadian authorities.
 November 15, 1902 – Gennaro Rubino attempts to murder King Leopold II of Belgium as he returns in a procession from a Requiem Mass for his recently deceased wife, Queen Marie Henriette. All three of Rubino's shots miss the monarch's carriage, and he is quickly subdued by the crowd and taken into police custody. He is sentenced to life imprisonment and dies in prison in 1918.

 February 17, 1905 – Ivan Kalyayev of the SR Combat Organisation kills Grand Duke Sergei Alexandrovich of Russia with a bomb. Despite efforts to spare him from the death penalty by the victim's widow, Grand Duchess Elizabeth Fyodorovna, Kalyayev was hanged on May 23, 1905.
 July 21, 1905 – Members of the Armenian Revolutionary Federation launch an attempt on the life of Ottoman Sultan Abdul Hamid II, but the bomb missed its target, instead killing 26 members of the Sultan's service. One of the conspirators, the Armenian anarchist Christapor Mikaelian, was killed during the planning stages. The Belgian anarchist Edward Joris was also among those arrested and convicted for their part in the plot.

 May 31, 1906 – Catalan anarchist Mateu Morral tries to kill King Alfonso XIII of Spain and Queen Victoria Eugenie immediately after their wedding by throwing a bomb into the procession. The King and Queen are unhurt, but 24 bystanders and horses are killed and over 100 persons injured. Morral is apprehended two days later and commits suicide while being transferred to prison.
 February 1, 1908 – Manuel Buíça and Alfredo Costa shoot to death King Carlos I of Portugal and his son, Crown Prince Luis Filipe, respectively, in the Lisbon Regicide. Both Buiça and Costa, who are sympathetic to a republican movement in Portugal that includes anarchist elements, are shot dead by police officers.

 February 23, 1908 – Sicilian anarchist Giuseppe Alia fatally shoots Fr. Leo Heinrichs, a Roman Catholic priest of the Franciscan Order, in front of a church filled with witnesses during Mass at St Elizabeth of Hungary Church in Denver, Colorado. Alia was arrested while attempting to flee the scene, convicted of first degree murder after four different alienists ruled him sane, and executed by hanging.
 March 28, 1908 – Anarchist Selig Cohen aka Selig Silverstein tries to throw a bomb in New York City's Union Square. A premature explosion kills a bystander named Ignatz Hildebrand and mortally wounds Cohen, who dies a month later. Several contemporary pictures taken after the explosion show the mortally wounded Silverstein with his victim next to him.
 November 14, 1909 – Argentine anarchist militant Simón Radowitzky assassinates Buenos Aires chief of police, Lieutenant Ramón Falcón by a throwing a bomb at his carriage while Falcón was returning from a deceased fellow officer's funeral. The assassination prompted President José Figueroa Alcorta to declare a state of siege and pass the Social Defense Law, which allowed the deportation of anarchist "agitators".
 June 15, 1910 – The Bosnian anarchist Bogdan Žerajić attempts to assassinate the Governor of Bosnia and Herzegovian Marijan Varešanin, but failed and subsequently committed suicide.
 September 14, 1911 – Dmitri Bogrov shoots Russian prime minister Pyotr Stolypin at the Kiev Opera House in the presence of Tsar Nicholas II and two of his daughters, Grand Duchesses Olga and Tatiana. Stolypin dies four days later, and Bogrov is hanged on September 28.
 November 12, 1912 – Anarchist Manuel Pardiñas shoots Spanish Prime Minister José Canalejas dead in front of a Madrid bookstore. Pardiñas then immediately turns the gun on himself and commits suicide.
 February 9, 1913 – The farmers Mulatilo Virgilio, Fermin Perez and Fabian Graciano assassinate Salvadoran President Manuel Enrique Araujo with machetes.
 March 18, 1913 – Alexandros Schinas shoots dead King George I of Greece while the monarch is on a walk near the White Tower of Thessaloniki. Schinas is captured and tortured; he commits suicide on May 6 by jumping out the window of the gendarmerie, although there is speculation that he could have been thrown to his death.
 June 28, 1914 – Members of Young Bosnia organize the assassination of Archduke Franz Ferdinand of Austria. The attempt of the Bosnian anarcho-syndicalist Nedeljko Čabrinović failed, but the attempt by Gavrilo Princip was successful, killing both the Archduke and his wife.
 July 4, 1914 – A bomb being prepared for use at John D. Rockefeller's home at Tarrytown, New York explodes prematurely, killing three anarchists, Arthur Caron, Carl Hansen and Charles Berg, and an innocent woman, Mary Chavez
 October 13 and November 14, 1914 – Galleanists – radical followers of Luigi Galleani – explode two bombs in New York City after police forcibly disperse a protest by anarchists and communists at John D. Rockefeller's home in Tarrytown.
 1914 – Marie Ganz threatens to shoot John D. Rockefeller as she arrives with a crowd and a loaded pistol in front of the Standard Oil Building in Manhattan. He is not in.
 July 22, 1916 – San Francisco Preparedness Day Bombing. 10 persons killed, 40 injured.
 November 24, 1917 – 9 policemen and a bystander in Milwaukee, Wisconsin killed when a time bomb left at a Catholic church by Galleanists was taken to a police station, where it exploded.

 April to June 1919 – 1919 United States anarchist bombings:
 April 28 –  Mayor Ole Hanson of Seattle, Washington, receives a Galleanist mail bomb (defused)
 April 29 – A Galleanist mail bomb intended for U.S. Senator Thomas W. Hardwick explodes, burning a servant and blowing off her hands.
 June 2 – Galleanist Carlo Valdinoci killed when his bomb (intended for the Washington DC home of U.S. Attorney General A. Mitchell Palmer)  explodes prematurely.
 June 3 – New York City night watchman William Boehner killed by a Galleanist bomb placed at a judge's house.
September 25, 1919–  The Explosion in Leontievsky Lane kills 12 and injures 55 in Moscow, Russia.
 September 16, 1920 – The Wall Street bombing kills 38 and wounds 400 in the Manhattan Financial District.  Galleanists are believed responsible, particularly Mario Buda, the group's principal bombmaker, although the crime remains officially unsolved.
 March 8, 1921 – Three anarchists on a motorcycle shoot dead Spanish Prime Minister Eduardo Dato Iradier in Puerta de Alcalá, Madrid.
 July 14, 1922 – Gustave Bouvet attempts to kill French president Alexandre Millerand.
 May 25, 1926 – Sholom Schwartzbard assassinates Symon Petliura, head of the government-in-exile of the Ukrainian People's Republic, in Paris. After an eight-day trial, he is acquitted by the jury, which was convinced of Schwartzbard's just cause: the core of his defense was that he was avenging the deaths of victims of pogroms by Petlura's forces. French prosecutors, on the other hand, had argued that Petliura opposed Pogroms, that Schwatzbard was an operative of the Soviet NKVD, and that the assassination of Petliura had been ordered by the Soviet Government. While debates continue over how much responsibility Petliura bore for Pogroms by his forces, since the opening of the Soviet archives, the prosecution has been proven correct in at least one regard. Schwartzbard was an NKVD operative carrying out a political assassination on French soil under orders from the Soviet State.
 October 31, 1926 – Anteo Zamboni (11 April 1911 – 31 October 1926) was a 15-year-old anarchist who tried to assassinate Benito Mussolini in Bologna, by shooting at him during the parade celebrating the March on Rome. Zamboni, whose shot missed Mussolini, was immediately attacked and lynched by nearby squadristi (fascist squads).
 1926–1928 – Several bombings in Argentina organized by the Italian anarchist Severino Di Giovanni, in the frame of the international campaign supporting Sacco and Vanzetti and against Fascist Italy's interests in Argentina. Bombings of the US embassy, of the Buenos Aires offices of City Bank of New York and Bank of Boston, and of the Italian consulate on May 23, 1928.
 September 27, 1932 –  A dynamite-filled package bomb left by Galleanists destroys Judge Webster Thayer's home in Worcester, Massachusetts, injuring his wife and a housekeeper.  Judge Thayer had presided over the trials of Galleanists Sacco and Vanzetti.
 February 15, 1933 Giuseppe Zangara attempts to kill US President Franklin Delano Roosevelt.
 May 1968 – Riots in Paris. The New-York based group "Black Mask" becomes Up Against the Wall Motherfuckers and carry out artistic propaganda of the deed.
 October 8, 1969 – The U.S. group Weatherman's first event is to blow up a statue in Chicago, Illinois, dedicated to the Chicago Police Department casualties of the bomb thrown into the 1886 Haymarket Riot. The "Days of Rage" riots then occur in Chicago during four days. 287 Weatherman members are arrested, and one of them killed.
 December 6, 1969 – Several Chicago Police Department squad cars in a Precinct parking lot at 3600 North Halsted Street, Chicago, are bombed. The Weather Underground Organization (WUO) later stated in their book Prairie Fire that they had perpetrated the explosion to protest the shooting deaths of the Illinois Black Panther Party leaders Fred Hampton and Mark Clark two days earlier, officially while resisting arrest by CPD officers.
 1970–1972 – The British Angry Brigade group carries out at least 25 bombings (police numbers). Almost all property damage, although one person was slightly injured.
 September 12, 1970 – The WUO helps Dr. Timothy Leary, LSD scientist, break out and escape from the California Men's Colony prison.
 October 8, 1970 – Bombing of Marin County (California, US) Courthouse in retaliation for the deaths of Jonathan Jackson, William Christmas, and James McClain.
 October 10, 1970 – The Queens Courthouse is bombed to express support for the New York prison riots.
 October 14, 1970 – The Harvard Center for International Affairs is bombed to protest the war in Vietnam.
 September 28, 1973 – The ITT headquarters in New York and Rome, Italy are bombed in response to ITT's role in the September 11, 1973 Chilean coup.
 November 6, 1973 – The U.S. group Symbionese Liberation Army (SLA) assassinates Oakland, California superintendent of schools Dr. Marcus Foster and badly wounds his deputy Robert Blackburn.
 December 20, 1973 – Spanish Prime Minister Luis Carrero Blanco was assassinated in Madrid as his car drove over a bomb planted by the Basque separatist group ETA.
 September 11, 1974 – Bombing of Anaconda Corporation (part of the Rockefeller Corporation) in retribution for Anaconda's involvement in Pinochet's coup exactly a year before.
 December 1975 – Greek organization Revolutionary Organization 17 November allegedly responsible of the assassination of CIA station chief in Athens Richard Welch. According to a December 2005 article by Kleanthis Grivas, journalist in Proto Thema, Sheepskin, Gladio's branch in Greece, was in fact behind the killing. US State Department denied Grivas' allegations in January 2006.
 January 28, 1975 – Bombing of the U.S. State Department by Weather Underground in response to escalation in Vietnam.
 April 21, 1975 – The remaining members of the SLA rob the Crocker National Bank in Carmichael, California and kill Myrna Opsahl, a bank customer, in the process.
 September 1975 – Bombing of the Kennecott Corporation in retribution for Kennecott's involvement in the Chilean coup two years prior.
 May 1, 1979 – French group Action Directe carries out a machine gun attack on the employers' federation headquarters.
 May 30, 1982 – The Canadian group Direct Action (aka "Squamish Five") set off a large bomb at an electricity transmission project. Four transformers were wrecked beyond repair, but no one was injured.
 November 18, 1982 Wanganui Computer Centre bombing, New Zealand
 1984 – Bomb-attacks of the Dutch organisation RaRa (Radical Anti-Racist Action) against the Van Heutsz monument (Van Heutsz was the Dutch commander during the Aceh War).
 1985–1987 – Dutch RaRa is responsible of several bomb-attacks on the Makro wholesale stores, which was active in South Africa.
 1985 – Action Directe assassinates René Audran, in charge of the state's arms-dealing.
 1986 – Georges Besse, CEO of Renault but before leader of Eurodif nuclear consortium (in which Iran had a 10 percent stake), is allegedly assassinated by Action Directe (although this thesis would be questioned, in particular by investigative journalist Dominique Lorentz).
 June 28, 1988 – US naval and defense attachée in Greece William Nordeen's assassination is reinvidicated by the Revolutionary Organization 17 November.
 September 26, 1989 – Assassination of Pavlos Bakoyannis, parliamentary leader of the centre-right New Democracy political party, by Greek paramilitary group Revolutionary Organization 17 November.
 November 13, 1991 – Dutch RaRa blow up the house of state secretary of justice Aad Kosto.
 June 30, 1993 – Dutch RaRa are responsible of bomb-attacks on the Dutch ministry of social affairs and employment.
 November 30, 1999 – Black blocs destroy the storefronts of GAP, Starbucks, Old Navy, and other multi-nationals with retail locations in downtown Seattle during the anti-WTO demonstrations.
 June 8, 2000 – Assassination of British military attache Stephen Saunders in Greece. Members of 17N are arrested. In December 2005, Kleanthis Grivas, journalist in Proto Thema, claims that Sheepskin, Gladio's branch in Greece, was in fact behind the killing, along with the first violent act of 17N, Richard Welch CIA station chief's assassination in 1975. US State Department denied Grivas' allegations in January 2006.
 July 13, 2019 – Anarchist Willem Van Spronsen attempts to ignite a propane tank in an attack on an ICE detention facility in Tacoma, Washington, USA and is killed in the ensuing police response.

Armed propaganda 
Armed propaganda is a type of propaganda used by revolutionary organizations that uses destructive, but ideally not lethal violence to make a political point known to the public and eventually gain supporters for its cause. The term was used in the United States by the Weather Underground and the Black Panther Party to describe some of their bombings. Although armed propaganda can use guns or bombs, its proponents argue that its goal is debatably different from that of pure terrorism.

United States 
Dan Berger, in his book about the Weatherman organization, Outlaws in America, describes the planning section for a townhouse bombing by the group, describing the action as "armed propaganda".

Latin America 
The term has been applied to guerillas in Latin America in their revolutionary literature.

Iran 
Bizhan Jazani used a translation of the term to describe armed struggle in Iran, particularly the Fadai guerrillas.

See also 
 Artivism
 Civil disobedience
 V (comics)

References

Bibliography 
 
 
 
 
 
 Hansen, Ann, Direct Action: Memoirs Of An Urban Guerrilla, AK Press, 2001
 
 
 Turgenev, Ivan, Fathers and Sons, 1862, paints the portrait of Russian nihilists.

Anarchist theory
History of anarchism
Social anarchism
Insurrectionary anarchism
Propaganda techniques
Terrorism tactics
Urban guerrilla warfare tactics